This is the episode list of , a Japanese tokusatsu television series produced by Tsuburaya Productions and aired on TV Tokyo. The series is slated to have 25 episodes in total and aired on TV Tokyo starting from July 9, 2016. Similar to its preceding series, Ultraman X, Orb is also simulcasted in North America via Crunchyroll site and APPs. A week after the end of Shin Ultraman Retsuden and before the premier of Ultraman Orb, a prologue special released on July 2, 2016.

At the end of each episode, a minisode called  aired and featuring Gai described the Ultra Fusion Card and the Monster Card of that episode. In accordance, the official website of Ultraman Orb would reveal each episode's references, easter eggs and in-jokes to past series in a segment called .

The first episode aired on July 9, 2016, and the date is exactly 50 years after , the pre-premiere special of Ultraman which recorded on July 9, 1966 and later aired on Tokyo Broadcasting System (the Ultra Series' original network before TV Tokyo) the next day in 7:00 pm.

On July 1, 2016, Tsuburaya plans on releasing another batch of Blu-ray release of Ultra Series. Among the sets are Ultraman Ace, Ultraman Orb, Ultraman Zearth movies, Ultraman: Towards the Future and Ultraman: The Ultimate Hero. Ultraman Orb's Blu-ray is set to contain 26 episodes and would be separated into two volumes, with each volume contains three discs separately: the first volume will be sold on November 25, 2016 and the second and last volume will be sold at February 24, 2017. Both volumes costed around 22,000 Yen.



Episodes

Notes

References

External links
Episode Lists on Ultraman Orb
Find the Subtitle on Ultraman Orb

Orb